Saaldorf-Surheim is a municipality in the district of Berchtesgadener Land in Bavaria in Germany.

References

Berchtesgadener Land